Maujaan Dubai Diyaan is a 1985 Indian Punjabi-language film directed by Subhash C. Bhakri, starring Vinod Mehra, Bhavana Bhatt, Madhu Malini, Aruna Irani, Ranjeet, Iftekhar, Kaajal Kiran and Mithun Chakraborty.

External links
 

1985 films
Punjabi-language Indian films
1980s Punjabi-language films